Gulbransen Company was a musical instrument manufacturer of player pianos and home organs in the United States. It also made reed organs. It was originally established in 1904 by Axel Gulbransen as Gulbransen Piano Company.

In the history of musical instruments, Gulbransen is notable for several innovations.  In its early years, Gulbransen made the first upright piano with a player piano mechanism in the same case. In the 1920s, thousands of player pianos were manufactured by the firm under the Gulbransen and Dickinson name. In the electronic organ era, Gulbransen pioneered several innovations in the production of home electronic organs that became industry standards:
 Use of transistor circuitry 
 Built-in Leslie speaker system
 Chime stop and piano stop
 "Automatic Rhythm" (built-in drum machine)
 "Automatic Walking Bass" (bass accompaniment)

In 1957, Gulbransen released the first transistorized electric organ "Gulbransen Model B" (Model 1100), although its use of transistors was limited to the tone generators, and vacuum tubes were still used for the power amplifier. (The first fully transistorized organ for churches was later built by Rodgers Instruments.)

Also in the 1960s, Gulbransen released one of the earliest transistorized rhythm machines "Seeburg/Gulbransen Select-A-Rhythm", collaborating with Seeburg Corporation. Note that Seeburg invented a fully transistorized rhythm machine in 1964, which was patented in 1967.

On the other hand, the owner of Gulbransen has changed several times since the 1950s. Around 1950, it was sold to CBS, then in 1964, merged with Seeburg Corporation, and production was once ceased in 1969. In 1985, Mission Bay Investments acquired the brand and produced Elka organs under the Gulbransen name. In 2002 or 2003, QRS Music Technologies acquired the brand and pianos were made by Samick.

See also 
 Electronic organ
 Drum machine
 Seeburg Corporation

References

External links 

 www.qrsmusic.com — Gulbransen history at QRS Music Technologies, Inc.

Piano manufacturing companies of the United States
Electronic organ manufacturing companies
Musical instrument manufacturing companies of the United States